Quad-channel computer memory is a memory bus technology used by AMD Socket G34 released on May, 2010, with Opteron 6100-series "Magny-Cours" (45 nm) and later by the Intel X79 chipset released on November, 2011, for LGA2011-based Core i7 CPUs utilizing the Sandy Bridge microarchitecture.  It is the successor of the triple-channel architecture used by the Intel X58 chipset for LGA1366-based CPUs.

See also
Multi-channel memory architecture

References

Computer memory